Cirrha was an ancient port of Phocis.

Cirrha, Kirrha, Kirha, or Kirra may also refer to:

Locations
 Kirra, Phocis, the modern site of ancient Cirrha
 Kirra, Queensland, a neighborhood of City of Gold Coast, Queensland
 Kırha, Bolu, a Turkish village of Bolu Province

Other uses
 Cirrha, a disused synonym of Gelechia moths
 Cirrha, a nymph after which Cirrha, Phocis, was said to have been named
 Cirrha Niva, a Dutch progressive metal band
 Kirra Dibb (born 1997), Australian rugby league footballer

See also
 Kira (disambiguation)